In mathematics, particularly abstract algebra, an algebraic closure of a field K is an algebraic extension of K that is algebraically closed.  It is one of many closures in mathematics.

Using Zorn's lemma or the weaker ultrafilter lemma,  it can be shown that every field has an algebraic closure, and that the algebraic closure of a field K is unique up to an isomorphism that fixes every member of K. Because of this essential uniqueness, we often speak of the algebraic closure of K, rather than an algebraic closure of K.

The algebraic closure of a field K can be thought of as the largest algebraic extension of K.
To see this, note that if L is any algebraic extension of K, then the algebraic closure of L is also an algebraic closure of K, and so L is contained within the algebraic closure of K.
The algebraic closure of K is also the smallest algebraically closed field containing K,
because if M is any algebraically closed field containing K, then the elements of M that are algebraic over K form an algebraic closure of K.

The algebraic closure of a field K has the same cardinality as K if K is infinite, and is countably infinite if K is finite.

Examples
The fundamental theorem of algebra states that the algebraic closure of the field of real numbers is the field of complex numbers.
The algebraic closure of the field of rational numbers is the field of algebraic numbers.
There are many countable algebraically closed fields within the complex numbers, and strictly containing the field of algebraic numbers; these are the algebraic closures of transcendental extensions of the rational numbers, e.g. the algebraic closure of Q(π).
For a finite field of prime power order q, the algebraic closure is a countably infinite field that contains a copy of the field of order qn for each positive integer n (and is in fact the union of these copies).

Existence of an algebraic closure and splitting fields
Let  be the set of all monic irreducible polynomials in K[x].
For each , introduce new variables  where .
Write
 

Since I is strictly smaller than  R,
Zorn's lemma implies that there exists a maximal ideal M in R that contains I.
In the same way, an extension K2 of K1 can be constructed, etc. The union of all these extensions is the algebraic closure of K, because any polynomial with coefficients in this new field has its coefficients in some Kn with sufficiently large n, and then its roots are in Kn+1, and hence in the union itself. 

It can be shown along the same lines that for any subset S of K[x], there exists a splitting field of S over K.

Separable closure
An algebraic closure Kalg of K contains a unique separable extension Ksep of K containing all (algebraic) separable extensions of K within Kalg.  This subextension is called a separable closure of K. Since a separable extension of a separable extension is again separable, there are no finite separable extensions of Ksep, of degree > 1. Saying this another way, K is contained in a separably-closed algebraic extension field. It is  unique (up to isomorphism).

The separable closure is the full algebraic closure if and only if K is a perfect field. For example, if K is a field of characteristic p and if X is transcendental over K,  is a non-separable algebraic field extension.

In general, the absolute Galois group of K is the Galois group of Ksep over K.

See also
 Algebraically closed field
 Algebraic extension
 Puiseux expansion
Complete field

References

 
 

Field extensions